is a Japanese voice actress and singer. She is affiliated with Apollo Bay and made her voice acting debut in 2018. She is known for her roles as Izumi Shibusawa in Rifle is Beautiful and Ichiko Oda in Oda Cinnamon Nobunaga. In 2020, she made her major debut as a musician under Lantis with the release of her first single "Sunny Sunny Girl", the title track of which was used as the opening theme to Oda Cinnamon Nobunaga.

Biography

Early life
Kumada was born in Tokyo on February 3, 2000. From an early age, she had been a fan of the series Hunter × Hunter. She was inspired to become a voice actress after watching the anime series Puella Magi Madoka Magica, as well as citing Maaya Uchida as a personality she looked up to. While in junior high school, she was a member of a badminton club, while she played the koto in high school. After graduating from high school, she decided to participating in voice acting auditions. In 2017, she won the Grand Prix at the Anisong Stars audition.

Voice acting career
Kumada began her voice acting activities in 2018, voicing a character in the anime series Planet With. Later that year, she voiced her first named role as Ellen in That Time I Got Reincarnated as a Slime. In 2019, she voiced Izumi Shibusawa in Rifle is Beautiful; she and her co-stars performed the series' opening and ending themes. In 2020, she voiced Ichiko Oda in Oda Cinnamon Nobunaga. She will voice the characters Mina in Drugstore in Another World and Hibiki Morishima in Healer Girl.

Music career
Kumada made her music debut under Lantis in 2020 with the release of her first single "Sunny Sunny Girl"; the title track was used as the opening theme to Oda Cinnamon Nobunaga. Her second single  was released on April 21, 2021; "Brand New Diary" was used as the opening theme to the anime series The Slime Diaries, while "Mahō no Kaze" was used as the opening theme to the anime series Super Cub.

Filmography

Anime
2018
Planet With, Kigurumi tribe member
That Time I Got Reincarnated as a Slime, Ellen

2019
Kira Kira Happy Hirake! Cocotama, Chiharu Nanase
Rifle is Beautiful, Izumi Shibusawa

2020
Oda Cinnamon Nobunaga, Ichiko Oda

2021
The Slime Diaries: That Time I Got Reincarnated as a Slime, Ellen
Drugstore in Another World, Mina

2022
Healer Girl, Hibiki Morishima

Discography

Singles

References

External links
Official website 
Official agency profile 

2000 births
Living people
Anime musicians
Japanese women pop singers
Japanese voice actresses
Singers from Tokyo
Voice actresses from Tokyo